Aqajan Kandi (also Romanized as Āqājān Kandī; also known as Āqājeh Kandī) is a village in Nazarkahrizi Rural District, Nazarkahrizi District, Hashtrud County, East Azerbaijan Province, Iran. At the 2006 census, its population was 25, in 5 families.

References 

Towns and villages in Hashtrud County